Possible Sky is a composition for choir and orchestra by the American composer Meredith Monk.  The work was commissioned by the conductor Michael Tilson Thomas and the New World Symphony.  It was first performed April 4, 2003 in Miami Beach, Florida by Thomas and the New World Symphony.  The composition was Monk's first work for orchestra.

Composition

Inspiration and development
In composing Possible Sky, Monk made several visits to Miami to work with the musicians in developing the piece.  She described this process in the score program notes, writing:
Monk added:

Instrumentation
The work is scored for SAB choir and an orchestra comprising two flutes (2nd doubling piccolo), three oboes (1st doubling cor anglais), three clarinets (1st doubling E-flat clarinet, 3rd doubling bass clarinet), three bassoons (3rd doubling contrabassoon), four horns, three trumpets, three trombones, tuba, harp, piano (doubling synthesizer), four percussionists, and strings.

Reception
When Monk was named the 2012 Composer of the Year by Musical America, the Los Angeles Times music critic Mark Swed gave special praise to Possible Sky, writing, "arresting Monkian melodies, bittersweet and inexplicable but somehow immediate, percolate through the orchestra."  He added, "Even more startling, though, is the physicality. Orchestra musicians, bolstered by members of Monk's ensemble, sound as though they, too, make music from their bodies rather than merely following the directions of notes on a page."

References

Compositions by Meredith Monk
2003 compositions
Compositions for symphony orchestra
Music commissioned by the New World Symphony